The uvular ejective affricate is a type of consonantal sound, used in some spoken languages. A number of languages of southern Africa have a sound, commonly transcribed , that may be ambiguous between velar and uvular.

Features
Features of the uvular ejective affricate:

Occurrence

See also
 List of phonetic topics

References

External links
 

Uvular consonants
Affricates
Ejectives